Sven-Gunnar Larsson (born 10 May 1940) is a Swedish former footballer who played as a goalkeeper.

Larson represented Örebro SK and made 273 appearances in Allsvenskan from 1962 to 1975.

He was capped 27 times for the Swedish national team and participated in the 1970 FIFA World Cup and the 1974 FIFA World Cup as a 2nd goalkeeper.

In November 1965 he was signed as an amateur by Stoke City of the English first division : but the move was vetoed by the Football Association and he made only one appearance, in a friendly against Moscow Dynamo.

References

External links

 

1940 births
Living people
Swedish footballers
Sweden international footballers
1970 FIFA World Cup players
1974 FIFA World Cup players
Allsvenskan players
Örebro SK players
Grankulla IFK players
Association football goalkeepers